The Surrey Police and Crime Commissioner is the police and crime commissioner, an elected official tasked with setting out the way crime is tackled by Surrey Police in the English County of Surrey. The post was created in November 2012, following an election held on 15 November 2012, and replaced the Surrey Police Authority. The Previous incumbent was David Munro, who represented the Conservative Party. And as of 2021, Lisa Townsend is the new Police and Crime Commissioner for Surrey.

List of Surrey Police and Crime Commissioners

2021 election

2016 election

2012 election

References

Police and crime commissioners in England
Police and Crime Commissioner
Police and Crime Commissioner